There Goes the Motherhood is an American reality television series that premiered on Bravo on April 20, 2016. The show features six mothers who go on an eight-week parent education course guided by parenting expert Jill Spivack. The cast include Beth Bowen, Jen Bush, Meghan Conroy-Resich, Stefanie Fair, Leah Forester, and Alisa Starler.

Episodes

Reception
Common Sense Media rated the show 3 out of 5 stars.

References

External links

 
 
 

2010s American reality television series
2016 American television series debuts
2016 American television series endings
Bravo (American TV network) original programming
English-language television shows
Television series by Magical Elves